Schaffhauser Kantonalbank is a Swiss cantonal bank that serves and is based in Schaffhausen.

Organisation
Schaffhauser Kantonalbank was founded in 1883. It is wholly owned the Swiss Canton of Schaffhausen and serves the area with six branches and ten ATMs.  The bank offers both public and commercial banking services including savings, cards, real estate and investments.

The bank has assets of 8.83mln CHF (2020) and recorded a profit of 45.96mln CHF (2020).  By market share, Schaffhauser Kantonalbank is the 46th largest bank in Switzerland, and 18th largest Kantonalbank.

In 2015, the bank had to pay $1.6mln USD to the Department of Justice for unpaid tax of 182 accounts held by US customers.

Management structure
The Bank Council is the supervisory body of the Schaffhauser Kantonalbank. This consists of nine members and is currently chaired by Florian Hotz. The Canton of Schaffhausen determines the members.

The organisational management is led by Martin Vogel, CEO. He previously worked for Schweizerischer Bankverein and UBS.

Locations
Schaffhauser Kantonalbank operate six main branches in the canton:
Schaffhausen
Neuhausen am Rheinfall
Stein am Rhein
Thayngen
Ramsen
Gächlingen

See also
Cantonal bank
List of banks
List of banks in Switzerland

References

External links
 Official website

Cantonal banks
Banks established in 1883
Companies of Switzerland
Canton of Schaffhausen
Schaffhausen